The Hum Award for Best Drama Serial Viewers Choice or Popular is one of the Hum Awards of Merit presented annually by the Hum Television Network and Entertainment Channel (HTNEC) to producers working in the drama industry. Best Drama Serial Viewers Choice/Popular is considered the most important of the Hum Awards, as it represents all the directing, acting, music composing, writing, editing and other efforts put forth into a drama. The nominations are selected by Hum membership as a whole while winners are selected by Online voting of Public thus called Viewers Choice or Popular. This category is the equivalent to the Hum Award for Best Drama Serial - Jury, decide by Hum membership and selected panel of Jury by Hum.

History
The best drama Viewers Choice category originates with the 2nd Hum Awards ceremony since 2014. This category has been given to the best drama of previous year to the ceremony held by public voting. Since Hum Awards has been just started, this category has not a brief history. The name of the category officially termed by the channel is:

 2014 → present: Hum Award for Best Drama Serial - Popular

Winners and nominees 
In the list below, winners are listed first in the colored row, followed by the other nominees. The year shown is the one in which the drama serial first telecast; normally this is also the year before the ceremony at which the award is given; for example, a drama serial exhibited telecast during 2005 then this will be eligible for consideration for the 2005 Best Drama Serial Hum Awards, awarded in 2006. The number of the ceremony (1st, 2nd, etc.) appears in parentheses after the awards year, linked to the article on that ceremony. Each individual entry shows the title followed by the production company, and the producer. From Second ceremony, the Best Drama Serial Viewers Choice award has given to Production company rather than to producer.

For the first ceremony, the eligibility period spanned full calendar years. For example, the 1st Hum Awards presented on April 28, 2013, to recognized dramas that were released between January, 2012, and December, 2012, the period of eligibility is the full previous calendar year from January 1 to December 31.

Date and the award ceremony shows that the 2010 is the period from 2010-2020 (10 years-decade), while the year above winners and nominees shows that the dramas year in which they were telecast, and the figure in bracket shows the ceremony number, for example; an award ceremony is held for the dramas of its previous year.

2010s

References

External links 
Official websites
 
Other resources
 
 2nd Hum Awards Pakistan Today 
 Hum Awards: Not at all Ho-Hum Dawn News

Hum Award winners
Hum Awards